Robert "Bob" Vagg (born 3 April 1941 in Colac, Victoria) is a former Australian rules footballer who played with Hawthorn in the Victorian Football League (VFL).

Hawthorn recruited Vagg on the back of his Michelsen Medal winning season for Echuca in 1963. He appeared in three of the first four rounds of the 1964 VFL season but from then on struggled with injuries. A defender, he returned to the Bendigo Football League once his time at Hawthorn came to an end and went on to play over 200 games for Echuca before retiring in the 1970s.

References

1942 births
Australian rules footballers from Victoria (Australia)
Hawthorn Football Club players
Echuca Football Club players
Living people